Comil Carrocerias e Onibus is a Brazilian bus and coach manufacturing company established in 1985 with the purchase of the bus company Incasel. Based in Erechim, Rio Grande do Sul, Brazil, it also has a factory in Mexico. Its products had been exported to 29 countries.  Comil also manufactures grain storage buildings and equipment, and had abandoned the bus manufacturing business for two years. In 2002, Comil resumed bus production.

Notes

References

External links

 Official website

Bus manufacturers of Brazil
Defence companies of Brazil
Companies based in Rio Grande do Sul
Vehicle manufacturing companies established in 1985
Brazilian brands
1985 establishments in Brazil